Silvia Carrera Concepción (born 1970 in Cerro Pelado) is the current General Cacique of the Ngöbe-Buglé Comarca autonomous indigenous territory of western Panama. She was elected in September 2011.

She has received global attention after representing her people in discussions with the Government of Panama concerning mineral mining within the Comarca. She also received additional notoriety by publicly refusing an invitation from President Ricardo Martinelli of Panama to dine with him at the Presidential Palace in Panama City to discuss permitting copper mining in the Ngöbe-Buglé Comarca.

Quotes
"The land is our mother. It is because of her that we live. The people will defend our mother."
"The government use us to entertain themselves, saying one thing today and another tomorrow."

References

1970 births
Living people
21st-century Panamanian women politicians
21st-century Panamanian politicians